Swamini is an Indian Marathi language historical TV series which aired on Colors Marathi. The show starred Aishwarya Narkar, Srushti Pagare, Revati Lele and Chinmay Patwardhan in lead roles. The series premiered from 9 September 2019 and ended on 26 December 2020.

Cast 
 Srushti Pagare as child Ramabai
 Revati Lele as elder Ramabai
 Chinmay Patwardhan as Elder Madhavrao
 Aishwarya Narkar as Gopikabai
 Neena Kulkarni
 Amol Bawdekar
 Sanika Banaraswale
 Kunjika Kalwint
 Rugvedi Pradhan
 Surabhi Bhave-Damle
 Abhishek Rahalkar
 Uma Pendharkar
 Anil Gawas
 Gururaj Avadhani
 Sanyogita Bhave

Reception

Airing history

References

External links 
 
 Swamini at Voot

2019 Indian television series debuts
Colors Marathi original programming
Marathi-language television shows
2020 Indian television series endings